Bothragonus is a genus of marine ray-finned fishes belonging to the family Agonidae, the poachers and related fishes. It is the only genus in monotypic subfamily Bothragoninae. These fishes are found in the northern Pacific Ocean.

Taxonomy
Bothragonus wa sfirst proposed as a genus by the American zoologist Theodore Gill in 1883 with Hypsagonus swanii, which had been described in 1876 by Franz Steindachner from Port Townsend on Puget Sound in Washington, as its type species. In 1971 the Soviet ichthyologist Georgii Ustinovich Lindberg proposed that the genus Bothragonus be placed in the new subfamily of the Agonidae, the Bothragoninae, although this was not universally accepted. The 5th edition of Fishes of the World recognises the validity of the Bothragoninae as a subfamily of the Agonidae.

Species
There are currently two recognized species in this genus:
 Bothragonus occidentalis Lindberg, 1935
 Bothragonus swanii (Steindachner, 1876) (Rockhead)

Etymology
Bothragonus is a combination of bothra, meaning "cavity", a reference to the deep pit on the nape, and Agonus the type genus of the Agonidae.
2

Characteritics
Bothragonus is characterised by haveing the head and the front part of the body having a rhomboid cross section with the rear part of the body being laterally compressed. The first dorsal fin and the anal fin are poorly developed. There is a row of bony plates located between the upper and main lateral lines and another row is located between the two lower lateral lines. There is an enlarged, spineless plate on the snout and the lower side of the head is armoured with a number of sharply spined plates. The sensory canal on the occipital is broken at its middle. The urohyal has no pelvic keel, there is a postpelvic spine and two epurals.

Distribution and habitat
Bothragonus are found in the eastern and western North Pacific Ocean. They are found in shallow waters of less than  depth and may be found in tidal pools.

References

Agonidae
 
Taxa named by Theodore Gill